Saxton is a village in North Yorkshire, England,  southwest of York and  east of Leeds.  The resident population is about 250.  It is close to the battlefield of Towton (Wars of the Roses). The closest town is Tadcaster.

History
The place-name 'Saxton' is first attested in the Domesday Book of 1086, where it appears as Saxtun. This is from the Old English Seax-tūn, meaning 'town or settlement of the Saxons'.

Saxton is home to an Anglican church, a primary school, a village hall, one pub, the Greyhound owned and operated by Samuel Smith's Old Brewery, a cricket club, and the surviving medieval motte of Saxton Castle which was built in the eleventh century.

All Saints' Church is a grade I listed structure which dates back to the 11th century. Some of the bodies of those who were killed in the Battle of Towton were buried in the churchyard. The men who gave their lives in the First World War are remembered on the War Memorial outside the church and a plaque inside the church.

References

Sources

External links

A CommuniGate Page
The Towton Battlefield Society Homepage
General information about the village of Saxton
Saxton Cricket Club Homepage
Saxton War Memorial

Selby District
Villages in North Yorkshire